Romanesque is the debut extended play released by the Japanese rock band Buck-Tick. It was released on 12-inch vinyl, cassette and 8 cm CD (which contains a bonus track) on March 21, 1988 through Victor Entertainment. The extended play peaked at number twenty on the Oricon charts and has sold 40,000 copies worldwide.

Track listing

Personnel
 Atsushi Sakurai – lead vocals, se
 Hisashi Imai – lead guitar, backing vocals
 Hidehiko Hoshino – rhythm guitar, acoustic guitar, backing vocals
 Yutaka Higuchi – bass
 Toll Yagami – drums, percussion

Additional performers
 Julie Fowell – backing vocals on "Romanesque" (Sensual Pleasures Mix)

Production
 Buck-Tick – producers
 Yasuaki "V" Shindoh – engineer, mixing
 Ken Sakaguchi – cover art, graphic design
 Masafumi Sakamoto – photography

References

1988 debut EPs
Buck-Tick albums
Victor Entertainment EPs
Japanese-language EPs